Azaria may refer to:

 Azaria, a moshav in central Israel

 Hank Azaria, American actor, voice actor, comedian and producer
 Nati Azaria, Israeli footballer
 Aviv Azaria, Israeli footballer
 Elor Azaria, Israeli soldier
 Rachel Azaria, Israeli politician
 Eitan Azaria, Israeli retired footballer and Football Mental Consultant
 Alexandre Azaria, French composer, songwriter and musician
 Aristaces Azaria, Armenian Catholic abbot and archbishop

 Death of Azaria Chamberlain, Australian baby girl who was killed by a dingo on the night of 17 August 1980
 The Disappearance of Azaria Chamberlain, Australian TV movie about the Azaria Chamberlain case

See also 
 Azria (surname)
 Azariah (disambiguation)
 Azarian (surname)
 Azaryan (surname)
 Azarias (given name)